Sussex county cricket teams have been traced back to the early 18th century but the county's involvement in cricket dates from much earlier times as it is widely believed, jointly with Kent and Surrey, to be the sport's birthplace. The most widely accepted theory about the origin of cricket is that it first developed in early medieval times, as a children's game, in the geographical areas of the North Downs, the South Downs and the Weald.

17th century
The first definite mention of cricket in Sussex relates to ecclesiastical court records in 1611 which state that two parishioners of Sidlesham in West Sussex failed to attend church on Easter Sunday because they were playing cricket. They were fined 12 pence each and made to do penance. A number of such cases were heard in Sussex during the 17th century and there were two instances of players dying, both in Sussex, after being struck on the head during a match.

Despite these problems, cricket became established in Sussex during the 17th century and the earliest village matches took place before the English Civil War. It is believed that county teams were formed in the aftermath of the Restoration in 1660. Roy Webber, in his Phoenix History, states that "the period between 1650 and 1700 seems to be that in which the game took a real grip, and it would seem that cricket was centred mainly in the counties of Kent, Sussex and Hampshire". In 1697, the earliest "great match" recorded was for 50 guineas apiece between two elevens at a venue in Sussex.

18th century

Richmond and Gage
Matches involving the two leading Sussex patrons Charles Lennox, 2nd Duke of Richmond, and Sir William Gage were first recorded in 1725. The first teams that were nominally representative of Sussex as a county seem to have been assembled in the 1728 season to play against Edwin Stead's Kent. Three matches are known to have been played and all were won by Kent. A contemporary report says after the third match that it was "the third time this summer that the Kent men have been too expert for those of Sussex". In the 1729 season, a team led by Gage is believed to have achieved the sport's earliest known innings victory in a match against Kent. Gage's team was called "Surrey, Sussex & Hampshire" in one account, however, and so was not a Sussex team per se. In the context of the time, with cricket mostly confined to the south-eastern counties, the combined team was effectively a Rest of England side assembled to take on Kent, the strongest county.

Slindon
From 1741, Richmond patronised the noted Slindon Cricket Club, whose team was probably representative of the county and at one stage was proclaimed to be the best team in England. Slindon's best-known player was Richard Newland, supported by his brothers Adam and John; and by the controversial Edward Aburrow, a good cricketer but a known smuggler.

Hambledon connection
Despite some periods of decline, Sussex teams continued to hold first-class status throughout the 18th century. It has been suggested by historians that the Hambledon Club represented Sussex as well as Hampshire for inter-county purposes. Several noted Sussex cricketers, including Richard Nyren and Noah Mann, played for Hambledon.

Brighton
Cricket in the county saw a revival during the Regency period that coincided with the rise of Brighton as a fashionable resort. Brighton Cricket Club became prominent and was, for a long time, representative of Sussex as a county. Sussex (i.e., Brighton) had a particularly successful 1792 season when it won all four of its matches, winning against MCC (three times) and Middlesex.

19th century

Napoleonic Wars
Despite a crippling loss of manpower and investment, cricket managed to survive the Napoleonic Wars and much of the credit for keeping the game alive goes to the Brighton club as well as to MCC.

Roundarm revolution
Brighton's reward was to see Sussex achieve great prominence in the aftermath of the war and it was the Sussex bowlers William Lillywhite and Jem Broadbridge who led the roundarm revolution of the 1820s.

Foundation of the county club
In 1836, the first steps were taken towards forming a county club. A meeting in Brighton set up a Sussex Cricket Fund to support county matches. It was from this organisation that Sussex County Cricket Club was formally constituted on 1 March 1839.

For the history of Sussex cricket since the foundation of the county club, see Sussex County Cricket Club.

References

Bibliography
 
 
 
 

History of Sussex
English cricket teams in the 18th century
English cricket in the 19th century
Former senior cricket clubs
Cricket in East Sussex
Cricket in West Sussex
Sussex County Cricket Club